How to Solve Our Human Problems is the collective title of three EPs by the band Belle and Sebastian, released through Matador Records between 2017 and 2018. The EPs were eventually compiled as a compilation album on 16 February 2018.

Track listing

References

Belle and Sebastian compilation albums
Belle and Sebastian EPs
2018 compilation albums
2017 EPs
2018 EPs
Matador Records albums
Albums produced by Leo Abrahams
Albums produced by Inflo